Şükrü Özyıldız (born 18 February 1988) is a Turkish actor. He is best known for his roles in the series Benim Hala Umudum Var, Şeref Meselesi and Kış Güneşi.

Life 
Özyıldız was born in the city of İzmir. During Ottoman Empire, His maternal family is of Rûm descent who immigrated from Rhodes.   His father is of Turkish descent from Trabzon. After earning a steat the Department of Ship Mechanics Engineering at Istanbul Technical University and studying in Istanbul for one year, he started studying again at Ege University and then went to Portugal under the Erasmus program. Özyıldız has been interested in martial arts since he was a youngster and has participated in cage fights in Portugal. After participating in a workshop on acting, he realized that he liked the experience very much and decided to study acting at the Müjdat Gezen Art Center. 

Starting in 2011, he debuted in the series Derin Sular. He played as Efe and portrayed the twin of the character named "Mete" in Kış Güneşi alongside Aslı Enver. He played in Tatlı Küçük Yalancılar which adaptation of Pretty Little Liars. Since then he has appeared in major films and television productions in his native country, including Çoban Yıldızı,  Şeref Meselesi and Benim Hala Umudum Var. His most recent role on TV was in the series Akıncı, which was broadcast on the Turkish television channel ATV.

Filmography

Film

Television

References

External links 

1988 births
Living people
Turkish male film actors
Turkish male television actors
Actors from İzmir
Turkish people of Greek descent